The Prude is a 1986 French-Belgian drama film directed by Jacques Doillon. It was entered into the main competition at the 43rd Venice International Film Festival.

Cast 
Michel Piccoli: Pierre
Sabine Azéma: Ariane
Sandrine Bonnaire: Manon
Laurent Malet: François
 Brigitte Coscas : Waist of Manon
 Anne Coesens : Voice of  Manon
 Corinne Dacla : Ear of  Manon
 Jessica Forde : Hand of  Manon

References

External links

1986 films
French drama films
Belgian drama films
1986 drama films
Films directed by Jacques Doillon
Films scored by Philippe Sarde
1980s French-language films
French-language Belgian films
1980s French films